Jack Jersawitz, more commonly known as Big Jack (August 13, 1934 – December 6, 2012) was an American television host and a self-proclaimed Marxist activist.

Jersawitz hosted a Public-access TV show called Brainstorms, a current events talk show on People TV, notable for live telephone calls, mostly consisting of prank calls  usually from the 404 area code with calls ranging from asking him if he was The Penguin and other crude jokes.

Personal life
Jack Jersawitz was born on August 13, 1934, in Brooklyn, New York. He earned his high school equivalency degree in 1997, the same year he made his first, unsuccessful bid for mayor of Atlanta, Georgia. In 2001, Jersawitz ran again and proposed to get rid of property taxes for city homeowners making less than $100,000; suggested the Police Department be done away with; and vowed to fire any city official who did not comply with an Open Records Act request. He also won several important lawsuits relating to civil liberties and briefly studied the origins of jazz and film analysis at Georgia State through a program that offered free classes to senior citizens. He worked as a printer, handyman and a mechanic, before he retired. Jack was purported to be the last true Communist in North America, said his friends; Jersawitz believed that the capitalist bosses, were manipulative of everything, and took advantage of the government, and that as a result of that, the workers were left out in the cold. He vehemently disagreed with any policy that was not the best interest of the public.

Career
Jersawitz hosted a Public-access TV show called Brainstorms. The show offered viewers live telephone calls, which made it a target for prank callers. Jersawitz took a firm left-wing stance on his show, and even claimed to be visited by the United States Secret Service for comments that he made when talking about his belief that the President of the United States should be publicly tried and hanged. During the prank calls that bombarded his show, a man by the name of the #1 Caller was the most notable prank caller that harassed him during his show Brainstorms. Another show of his was Telling it Like it is. Jersawitz stated in 2001 that he picks the side of the poor, the oppressed, the working class and those who never got a chance to be part of the working class. His oft-used verbal tactic in public meetings was dubbed a Jack Attack, from his early days he truly believed that capitalism was wrong and Marxism and Communism was the path we all needed to follow.

Death
Jersawitz died on December 6, 2012, in Atlanta, Georgia after battling several illnesses, including esophageal cancer and chronic obstructive pulmonary disease.

References

1934 births
2012 deaths
People from Brooklyn
American activists
American Marxists
Jewish American atheists
Television anchors from Atlanta